Stelmužė is a village in Zarasai district municipality of Lithuania. There is a wooden chapel built in 1650 not using saws or iron nails; it is the oldest wooden religious building in Lithuania. Stelmužė is also known for the Tower of Slaves, a rectangular building constructed of stone and bricks in the 18th century, used for imprisonment of serfs.

The village is famous for its Stelmužė Oak, the oldest in Lithuania and one of the oldest in Europe. The oak is about one and a half thousand years old.

References

Villages in Utena County
Zarasai District Municipality